Underground, Inc. was a Chicago-based subsidiary of Invisible Records, consisting of a collective of independent labels, producing various studio albums by Invisible Records artists, side projects and compilations with the same focus on being artist driven as its parent label. Music ranged from indie, goth, electro, punk, and industrial.

Artists

 Acumen Nation
 Apocalypse Theater
 Asmodeus X
 Chemlab
 Chris Connelly
 Colony 5
 DJ? Acucrack
 Dkay.com
 Einstürzende Neubauten
 Hate Dept.
 Chris Haskett
 Keith Levene
 Kill Memory Crash
 Lorin Morgan-Richards
 Meg Lee Chin
 Mistle Thrush
 More Machine Than Man
 My Life with the Thrill Kill Kult
 Nocturne
 Rachel Stamp
 Pigface
 Public Image Limited
 Professional Murder Music
 Razed in Black
 Sheep on Drugs
 Slick Idiot
 SMP
 Sunshine Blind
 The Damage Manual
 Tub Ring

References

External links
 Official website

Invisible Records
Industrial record labels
Goth record labels